This is a list of types of swords.

The term sword used here is a narrow definition. This is not a general List of premodern combat weapons and does not include the machete or similar "sword-like" weapons.

African swords

North African swords
 Flyssa (19th century Algeria)
 Kaskara (19th century Sudan)
 Khopesh (Egyptian)
 Mameluke sword (18th to 19th century Egyptian)
 Nimcha (18th century Morocco and Algeria)

East African swords
 Billao (Somali)
 Shotel (Eritrea and Ethiopian)

West African swords
 Akrafena (Ghana and Togo)
 Ida (Nigeria and Benin)
 Takoba (Mali and Niger)

Central African swords
 Ikakalaka
 Mambele

Asian swords

East Asian swords

China

 Dao (刀 pinyin dāo) "sabre"
 Baguadao (八卦道)
 Butterfly sword (蝴蝶雙刀)
 Changdao (長刀)
 Dadao (大刀)
 Liuyedao (柳針刀)
 Miao dao (苗刀)
 Nandao (南刀)
 Piandao (片刀)
 Wodao (倭刀)
 Yanmaodao (雁翎刀)
 Zhanmadao (斬馬刀)
 Jian (劍 pinyin jiàn)
 Shuangshou jian (雙手劍)
 Hook sword (鉤)

Japan

 Nihonto (日本刀; にほんとう)
 Bokken (木剣)
 Chokutō (直刀)
 Hachiwara（鉢割）
 Iaitō (居合刀)
 Jintachi (陣太刀)
 Katana (刀; かたな)
 Kenukigata tachi (毛抜型太刀)
 Kodachi (小太刀)
 Nagamaki (長巻)
 Ninjato (忍者刀)
 Ōdachi/Nodachi (大太刀/野太刀)
 Sasuga (刺刀)
 Shinai (竹刀)
 Shinken (真剣)
 Shikomizue (仕込み杖)
 Tachi (太刀; たち)
 Tantō (短刀; たんとう)
 Tsurugi (剣)
 Wakizashi (脇差; わきざし)
 Dōtanuki
 Chanbara

Korea

 Hwandudaedo (환두대도; 环首大刀)
 Saingeom (사인검)

Southeast Asian swords
Swords and knives found in Southeast Asia are influenced by Indian, Chinese, Middle Eastern, and European forms.

Indonesia
 Alamang
 Amanremu
 Badik
 Balato (sword)
 Blakas
 Celurit
 Gari (sword)
 Golok
 Kabeala
 Karambit
 Keris
 Klewang
 Kujang
 Langgai Tinggang
 Luwuk (sword)
 Mandau
 Niabor
 Palitai
 Pandat
 Parang
 Rencong
 Sewar
 Si Euli
 Sikin Panjang
 Trisula

Myanmar
 Dha

Philippines
 Balasiong
 Balisword
 Bangkung
 Banyal
 Barong
 Batangas
 Bolo
 Dahong Palay
 Gayang
 Gulok
 Kalis
 Kampilan
 Panabas
 Pinuti
 Pirah
 Sundang
 Susuwat
 Utak

Thailand
 Daab
 Krabi

South Asian Swords

Bhutan
 Patag

Bladed Weapons of Indian subcontinent
 Kirpan
 Tegha (curved sword)
 Sirohi sword
 Asi
 Firangi
 Hengdang
 Talwar
 Kayamkulam vaal
 Khanda
 Malappuram Kathi
 Moplah
 Pata
 Ram-dao
 Urumi

Sri Lanka
 Kastane

West and Central Asian swords
 Acinaces (Scythian short sword)
 Chereb (modern Hebrew khérev): ancient Israelite sword mentioned 413 times in the Hebrew Bible.

The Ancient Greeks and Romans also introduced various types of swords, see #Ancient Europe.

Post-classical period 
All of the Islamic world during the 16th to 18th century, including the Ottoman Empire and Persia were influenced by the "scimitar" type of single-edged curved sword.
Via the Mameluke sword  this also gave rise to the European cavalry sabre.

Terms for the "scimitar" curved sword:
 Kilij (Turkish)
 Pulwar (Afghanistan)
 Shamshir (Persia)
 Talwar (Indo-Pakistani)
 Yataghan (Turkish)
 Khanjar (Arabian)
 Saif (Arabian)
 Scimitar (Arabian)
 Zulfiqar (Arabian)

European swords

Ancient Europe
 Bronze Age European swords
 Harpe: mentioned almost exclusively in Greek mythology
 Iron Age European swords
 Falcata/Kopis: one-handed single-edged swords – blade  – with forward-curving blade for slashing
 Falx: Dacian and Thracian one-handed or two-handed single-edged curved shortsword for slashing
 Gladius: Roman one-handed double-edged shortsword for thrusting (primary) and slashing, used by legionaries (heavy infantry) and gladiators, and late Roman light infantry. 3rd century BCE Roman Republic – late Roman Empire.
 Makhaira: Greek one-handed, single-edged shortsword or knife for cutting (primary) and thrusting
 Rhomphaia: Greek single-edged straight or slightly curved broadsword – blade  – for slashing (primary) and thrusting
 Spatha: Celtic/Germanic/Roman one-handed double-edged longsword – blade  – for thrusting and slashing, used by gladiators, cavalry and heavy infantry. 3rd century BCE Gaul/Germania – Migration Period.
 Xiphos: Greek one-handed, double-edged Iron Age straight shortsword 
 Xyele: The short, slightly curved, one-edged sword of the Spartans.
 Migration Period swords
 Spatha: continuation, evolved into
 Ring-sword (ring-spatha, ring-hilt spatha), Merovingian period
 Viking sword or Carolingian sword
 Krefeld type

Post-classical Europe

 Arming sword: high medieval knightly sword
 Curtana: a medieval term for a ceremonial sword
 Longsword: late medieval
 Backsword
 Falchion
 Estoc: thrust-oriented
 Claymore: late medieval Scottish
 Paramerion: Eastern Roman Byzantine sword
 Seax: shortsword, knife or dagger of varying sizes typical of the Germanic peoples of the Migration Period and the Early Middle Ages, especially the Saxons, whose name derives from the weapon.
 Viking sword or Carolingian sword: early medieval spatha
 Zweihänder: 1500-1600 Germany

Modern Europe
 Cutlass
 Early modern fencing
 Rapier
 Sabre
 Modern fencing (sport equipment)
 Épée
 Foil (fencing)
 Sabre (fencing)

North American swords
 U.S. regulation swords (sabres, and in some instances fascine knives shaped like short swords)

See also
 Classification of swords
 List of daggers
 List of premodern combat weapons
 Lists of swords

References

Type
Swords
swords